Bridgwater services is a motorway service station on the M5 motorway near Bridgwater in Somerset, England. The services are located off junction 24, near the Somerset town of Bridgwater and can be accessed from both carriageways via a roundabout on the A38 road. It is owned by Moto. It used to be operated by First Motorway Services.

In 2021, it was voted the worst motorway service station in the UK.

External links 

Moto Official Site - Bridgwater
Motorway Services Online - Bridgwater
Motorway Services Info - Bridgwater

References 

1999 establishments in England
M5 motorway service stations
Moto motorway service stations
Buildings and structures in Sedgemoor
Transport in Somerset
North Petherton